Mike Briggs (born September 6, 1968) is a former professional tennis player from the United States.

Career
Briggs, a two-time All-American, played tennis for the UC Irvine Anteaters in the late 1980s and with partner Trevor Kronemann made the NCAA doubles final in 1989, which they lost to Eric Amend and Byron Black. With Kronemann, Briggs also won his only ATP doubles title, at Tampa (as qualifiers), and reached the 1992 French Open and 1993 Australian Open third rounds. He won four ATP Challenger doubles tournaments.

ATP Tour finals

Doubles: 1 (1–0)

Challenger titles

Doubles: (4)

References

1968 births
Living people
American male tennis players
UC Irvine Anteaters men's tennis players
Tennis people from California